Union Station in Clinton, Massachusetts is a historic railroad station building. It was designed by architect Robert Reamer, best known for this Old Faithful Inn and other projects in the Western United States. The station opened in 1914 and has two levels that served tracks going in perpendicular directions.

References

1914 establishments in Massachusetts
Railway stations in the United States opened in 1914
Stations along Boston and Maine Railroad lines
Former railway stations in Massachusetts
Former New York, New Haven and Hartford Railroad stations